Matīss Burģis (born 31 August 1989) is a Latvian table tennis player. He represented Latvia at 2012 Summer Olympics, reaching the second round. Burģis was the first Latvian table tennis player who competed at Olympics. He was born in Priekule, Latvia.

References

External links
 

1989 births
Living people
Latvian table tennis players
Table tennis players at the 2012 Summer Olympics
Olympic table tennis players of Latvia
Table tennis players at the 2015 European Games
European Games competitors for Latvia
People from Priekule Municipality